Aram Khalili (born 28 July 1989) is an Iranian professional footballer who plays as a striker for Innstranden. He has represented the Norway U21 team.

Early life
Born in Bukan, Khalili is of Kurdish descent. He and his family emigrated to Kristiansand in 1997.

Club career
Khalili joined the Start youth system in 1999. He made his debut for Start in 2006, and made his breakthrough to the first team in 2008. In January 2011 he signed for Bodø/Glimt. In 2020 Khalili signed a deal with 4. division side Innstranden to become player-manager of the club.

International career
Khalili has also been capped for Norway U21, but later he was not called up to the Norway senior team. He is eligible to play for the Iran national team.

Career statistics

References

External links 
 

1989 births
Living people
People from Bukan
Norwegian people of Kurdish descent
Norwegian people of Iranian descent
Iranian emigrants to Norway
Sportspeople from Kristiansand
Sportspeople of Iranian descent
Kurdish sportspeople
Norwegian footballers
Iranian footballers
Association football forwards
Norway youth international footballers
Norway under-21 international footballers
Eliteserien players
Norwegian First Division players
Norwegian Second Division players
Allsvenskan players
IK Start players
GAIS players
FK Bodø/Glimt players
Notodden FK players
Bryne FK players
FK Jerv players
Norwegian expatriate footballers
Iranian expatriate footballers
Norwegian expatriate sportspeople in Sweden
Expatriate footballers in Sweden